John Ericson (sometimes spelled Erickson; September 25, 1926 – May 3, 2020) was a German-American film and television actor known primarily for his co-star role with actress Anne Francis on the ABC television series Honey West in the 1965-66 season.

Early life
Ericson's parents were Ellen Wilson, a Swedish actress and operatic star, and Carl F. Meibes, who later became president of a New York food extract corporation. The family left Germany, reportedly to escape the rising Nazi regime, and came to the United States. Ericson trained at the American Academy of Dramatic Arts in New York in the same class as Grace Kelly, Jack Palance and Don Rickles.

Career
Ericson gained early acting experience with stock companies at the Gateway Theatre in Gatlinburg, Tennessee, and Barter Theatre in Abingdon, Virginia. He appeared on Broadway in the original 1951 production of Stalag 17, directed by José Ferrer.

Ericson made a number of films for MGM in quick succession in the 1950s. His first appearance was in Teresa (1951), directed by Fred Zinnemann. He also appeared in Rhapsody, The Student Prince, Green Fire (all in 1954), and in Bad Day at Black Rock (1955). He co-starred with Barbara Stanwyck in Forty Guns (1957).  In 1958 he appeared as Sheriff Barney Wiley in the Western Day of the Badman which starred Fred MacMurray.  

For the next 30 years, his career continued mostly on television. He appeared in the lead role in "The Peter Bartley Story" of the CBS drama The Millionaire. He appeared with Dorothy Malone in the episode "Mutiny" of CBS's Appointment with Adventure (which aired on January 1, 1956). He made guest appearances in The Restless Gun (1958) and Target: The Corruptors! (1961). Ericson also guest starred twice on Bonanza: he played Vince Dagen in the 1960 episode "Breed of Violence" and he portrayed Wade Hollister in the 1967 episode "Journey to Terror". From 1965 to 1966, he co-starred as the partner of Anne Francis in Honey West. (He and Francis had played brother and sister in Bad Day at Black Rock.) In 1971, he appeared as Jack Bonham on The Men From Shiloh in the episode "The Political".

He played the title role in Pretty Boy Floyd (1960), and his other film appearances included roles in Under Ten Flags (1960), Slave Queen of Babylon (1963), 7 Faces of Dr. Lao (1964), Operation Atlantis (1965), The Money Jungle (1968), The Bamboo Saucer (1968), Bedknobs and Broomsticks (1971), Crash! (1976), and The Far Side of Jericho (2006).

Personal life and death
He was married twice and had two children from his first marriage to Milly Coury. He was married to his second wife Karen Huston Ericson for over 45 years. He died of pneumonia on May 3, 2020, aged 93.

Filmography

References

External links

 
 

1926 births
2020 deaths
German male film actors
German emigrants to the United States
American male film actors
American male stage actors
American male television actors
Male actors from New York (state)  
Metro-Goldwyn-Mayer contract players
20th-century American male actors
21st-century American male actors
Male Western (genre) film actors
Deaths from pneumonia in New Mexico
German people of Swedish descent
American people of German descent
American people of Swedish descent
American people of Scandinavian descent